The South Central Conference was an IHSAA-sanctioned conference from 1936 to 1997. The conference began as a collection of schools in mid-sized and large cities in South Central and Southeast Indiana, expanding into both Indianapolis (Washington and Southport) and far Southern Indiana (Jeffersonville). The conference had been as big as 10 in the 1950s, but was down to six schools in the 1980s. With Connersville and Rushville leaving in the advent of class basketball, being replaced by Bloomington North and Center Grove, the conference had shifted to a small conference of large schools. As class basketball was set to be introduced in the 1997-98 school year, the South Central and Central Suburban conferences, as well as large independent schools, decided to reorganize, giving way to Conference Indiana and the Metropolitan Interscholastic Conference.

Schools

 Was Columbus until 1972.
 Was Alva Neal High School before 1939.
 Played concurrently in SCC and EIAC 1974-77.
 Was Shields High School until 1959.
 Was Bloomington until 1972.

Membership timeline

References

Indiana high school athletic conferences
High school sports conferences and leagues in the United States
Indiana High School Athletic Association disestablished conferences